Odeya is a 2019 Indian Kannada-language action comedy film written and directed by M. D. Sridhar, and produced by Sandesh Nagaraj through the production studio Sandesh Combines. The film stars Darshan, debutante Sanah Thimmayyah, Devaraj and P. Ravi Shankar. The film's score is composed by V. Harikrishna with additional songs by Arjun Janya. It's a remake of the Tamil-language film Veeram.

Synopsis 

Gajendra cannot tolerate wrongdoings and takes care of them by any means he can. When he falls in love with Sakku, who leads a non-violent life, he decides to give it all up - but his resolve is tested when her family is in danger.

Cast 
 Darshan as Gajendra Narayana Varma
 Sanah Thimmayyah as Shakambari "Sakku" Devi
 Devaraj as Srinivas Odeyar
 P. Ravi Shankar as Narasimha 
 Sharath Lohitashwa as Bettappa (Local Gangster)
 Chikkanna as Lawyer Chari
 Madhusudhan Rao as Durga Prasad
 Sadhu Kokila as Parandhama Odeyar
 Ravishankar Gowda as District Commissioner Krishnamurthy
 Tabla Nani
Bhojaraj Vamanjoor
 Shruthi Raj

Music 

Music composed by Arjun Janya, and released on Anand Audio Company.

Release 
The film was released on 12 December 2019. It was a box office bomb.

References

External links 
 

Indian action comedy films
2019 masala films
2019 action comedy films
2019 films
2010s Kannada-language films
Kannada remakes of Tamil films
Films directed by M. D. Sridhar